Anarsia melanoplecta is a moth in the family Gelechiidae. It was described by Edward Meyrick in 1914. It is found in Bengal.

The wingspan is about 10 mm. The forewings are fuscous finely irrorated (sprinkled) with whitish and with an obscure darker blotch in the disc about one-fifth and a thick black oblique streak from the middle of the costa, reaching half across the wing. There is a semi-oval black spot on the costa at four-fifths and a black pre-apical dot, preceded by whitish, the area above and below it tinged with ochreous. The hindwings are grey.

The larvae have been recorded boring into the shoots of Mangifera indica.

References

melanoplecta
Moths described in 1914
Moths of Asia